Larisa Romanovna Oleynik (born June 7, 1981) is an American actress who became a teen idol in the 1990s.

Born in Santa Clara and raised in the San Francisco Bay Area of California, Oleynik began her career as a child actor, first appearing onstage as young Cosette in a national touring production of Les Misérables (1989–1991). She was subsequently cast in the titular role on the Nickelodeon sci-fi series The Secret World of Alex Mack from 1994 to 1998. She also began a film career, starring in an ensemble cast as Dawn Schafer in the film adaptation The Baby-Sitters Club (1995), and in a lead role in the teen comedy 10 Things I Hate About You (1999).

Oleynik subsequently had a supporting role in the comedy 100 Girls (2000), after which she starred opposite Nastassja Kinski and Scarlett Johansson in the period film An American Rhapsody (2001), and the independent drama Bringing Rain (2003). She later had supporting roles in Atlas Shrugged: Part II (2011) and the horror film Jessabelle (2014). From 2010 to 2015, she had a recurring role as Cynthia Cosgrove on the AMC series Mad Men, and a voice role as Icy on the Nickelodeon revival of Winx Club (2011–2014).

Early life and education
Larisa Romanovna Oleynik was born in Santa Clara, California, to Lorraine (née Allen), a former nurse, and anesthesiologist Roman Oleynik. Her father was of Russian and Ukrainian ancestry, and she was raised in the Russian Orthodox faith. Oleynik was raised in the San Francisco Bay Area. She graduated from the Pinewood School in Los Altos, California, in 1999. As her acting career flourished, she would "divide her time between normal childhood experiences in Northern California and auditions in Los Angeles."

After the success in her role as Alex Mack, Oleynik decided to attend college, enrolling at Sarah Lawrence College in Yonkers, New York, which she later described "the best decision I’ve made".

Career

1989–2002
Oleynik began acting in a San Francisco production of Les Misérables in 1989 after seeing an audition ad in a newspaper when she was eight years old. She obtained two parts in the production (young Cosette and young Eponine), both with singing roles. After appearing in the musical, she was referred to an agent by her Les Misérables co-star, Rider Strong, and began to take formal acting lessons. "I remember being 10 years old and thinking, 'I want to be good at this'... It wasn’t about, 'I want to be on TV'. It was more looking around at the other kids and being like, 'I’m not good at sports, I’m not really smart. I think I could be good at this, though'."

Her onscreen acting career began at age 12, in a 1993 episode of the television series Dr. Quinn, Medicine Woman; the same year she also appeared in the made-for-television film River of Rage: The Taking of Maggie Keene, and provided the voice of young Odette in the animated feature film The Swan Princess (1994).

Later in 1993, she was cast in the lead role of the series The Secret World of Alex Mack where she portrayed a teenage girl who receives telekinetic powers as the result of an accident. She won the role of Alex Mack over 400 other aspirants. The series ran on Nickelodeon from 1994 to 1998 and was one of the network's top three most watched shows, becoming quite a favorite among the child and teen audiences and turning Oleynik into a teen idol. During the show's heyday, children who met Oleynik (and were too young to understand special effects) would often ask her to "morph" for them. Rather than try to explain things, she would quickly glance around, then tell them "Not here – everybody would see!". Oleynik reprised the role in an All That sketch, although the name was changed to "Alex Sax". She later made an appearance in the 100th episode of the show.

In 1996, she made a cameo on the series The Adventures of Pete & Pete as a nurse at the beginning of the episode "Dance Fever". Also during her time on The Secret World of Alex Mack, she played Dawn Schafer, one of the lead characters in the 1995 feature film The Baby-Sitters Club (1995), opposite Rachael Leigh Cook and Schuyler Fisk, appeared in several episodes of Boy Meets World, wrote an advice column for Tiger Beat magazine, and was involved in Nickelodeon's The Big Help charity, Hands Across Communication, Surfrider Foundation and the Starlight Children's Foundation. She has also hosted the CableACE Awards, Daytime Emmy Awards, YTV Achievement Awards, The Nickelodeon Kids' Choice Awards as well as The Big Help. She has commented that she stayed "grounded" during her period as a teen star, mainly through the help of a "strong network of people" that she was close to.

After The Secret World of Alex Mack ended its run, Oleynik had a starring role in the film 10 Things I Hate About You as Bianca. The film was released in April 1999, and did fairly well at the box office, grossing a total of $38 million domestically. From 1998 to 2000, Oleynik appeared in twenty-one episodes of the NBC series 3rd Rock from the Sun as Alissa Strudwick. During 2000, she also appeared in two independent films: 100 Girls (opposite Emmanuelle Chriqui, Katherine Heigl and Jonathan Tucker) and A Time for Dancing (opposite Shiri Appleby); neither film received a theatrical release in the United States.

Oleynik had a supporting role in the independent drama film An American Rhapsody (2001), opposite Nastassja Kinski and Scarlett Johansson, which follows a young woman whose parents are forced to leave her behind in Communist Hungary while they flee to the United States.

2003–present
Oleynik had a supporting part in Bringing Rain (2003), a low-budget teen drama starring Adrian Grenier and Paz de la Huerta, which premiered at the Tribeca Film Festival. In 2005, she appeared as a guest star on the series Malcolm in the Middle as Reese's lesbian army buddy who develops a crush on his mother. Oleynik was cast in a supporting role in the series Pepper Dennis, which began airing on The WB in April 2006, but was not picked up by The WB's successor The CW. The same year, she starred in the independent drama Pope Dreams.

In March 2008, Oleynik guest-starred in episode 13 of Aliens in America. In 2009, she provided audio commentary for the 10 Things I Hate About You 10th Anniversary Edition Blu-ray. In March 2011, Oleynik started appearing in a recurring role on Hawaii Five-0 as CIA analyst Jenna Kaye, until her character was later killed off. She was subsequently cast in the Ayn Rand adaptation Atlas Shrugged: Part II (2012), as Cherryl Brooks, a store clerk who becomes acquainted with the protagonist, Dagny Taggart (portrayed by Samantha Mathis). John Tammy of Forbes praised it as a "must-see" film. Oleynik also guest-starred as Ken Cosgrove's girlfriend (and later wife) Cynthia Baxter in several episodes on the AMC television series Mad Men.

In 2016, Oleynik starred in the one-woman show I Loved, I Lost, I Made Spaghetti at the Hangar Theatre in Ithaca, New York. Beginning in 2017, Oleynik starred in the Off-Broadway musical comedy Baghdaddy. In 2020, Oleynik starred in the Netflix family comedy series, The Healing Powers of Dude.  In 2023 it was announced that Oleynik was cast as Sylvia in the upcoming Nickelodeon comedy Erin & Aaron.

Personal life
Oleynik resides in Venice, California.

In January 2013, she was granted a restraining order against a stalker who  was so obsessed with her that he changed his last name to "Oleynik".

Filmography

Film

Television

Stage credits

Explanatory notes

References

External links

 
 
 

1981 births
Actresses from the San Francisco Bay Area
American child actresses
American film actresses
American people of Russian descent
American people of Ukrainian descent
American television actresses
Living people
People from Santa Clara, California
Sarah Lawrence College alumni
20th-century American actresses
21st-century American actresses